Richard Henry Czarnecki (born 25 January 1963 pol. Ryszard Henryk Czarnecki) is a Polish politician and Member of the European Parliament (MEP) from Poland. He is a member of the Law and Justice, part of the European Conservatives and Reformists.

Prior to 2008, he was a member of the Self-Defense party.

He is part of the European Parliament Committee on Foreign Affairs, and is a substitute for the Committee on Constitutional Affairs and a member of the Delegation for relations with the countries of south-east Europe. Member of the "Group on South Asia","South Asia Peace Forum" and "Forum for Balochistan" in the European Parliament.

Education 

 Master of History, University of Wrocław
 1987: Archivist, Archiwum Akt Nowych, Warsaw (1986) 'Solidarność' Archives

Career 
 1988–1990: journalist with 'The Polish Daily', London
 editorial secretary
 1991: Deputy editor-in-chief 'Wiadomości Dnia'
 1991: editor-in-chief 'Dziennik Dolnośląski' (1991), acting director 'NORPOL-PRESS'
 1993–1997: Chief Editor for Religious programmes, Polsat TV
 2001–2004: Lecturer
 1994–1996: Chairman of the Christian-National Union (ZCHN)
 2002–2004: Expert 'Self-defence of the Polish Republic'
 Member in the I and III terms of the Parliament of the Republic of Poland
 Vice-Chairman of the Parliamentary Committee on Culture and Media
 Chairman of the Parliamentary Sub-committee on Copyright
 Chairman of the Polish-Italian Parliamentary Group
 1991–1993: parliamentary representative to the North Atlantic Treaty Organization
 Member of the Parliamentary Committee on European Integration
 1999–2001: Chairman of the Parliamentary Committee on Liaison with Poles Abroad
 2000–2001: Vice-Chairman of the Committee on European Law
 1991–2001: representative of the Polish Sejm (parliament) in the Parliamentary Assembly of the West European Union
 1993: Deputy Minister of Culture
 1997–1999: Minister for European Integration
 1997–1998: Head of the Committee on European Integration
 1998–1999: Minister – member of the Cabinet

In 2009 European Parliament election he is a candidate of Law and Justice from Kuyavian-Pomeranian constituency.

Confrontations with Róża Thun

Statement on Róża Thun's full name 
On 26 April 2009 – less than two months before the European elections – Czarnecki wrote a blog entry, describing the "troubles" of Róża Thun (a Polish politician and an Austrian Countess-consort) with the Polish National Electoral Commission. According to Czarnecki, the Civic Platform intended to register her candidacy under the name of Róża Thun, but the Commission refused, stating that according to the regulations, all candidates must appear under their full names on the ballot papers. "And so, the voters will see Róża Maria Gräfin von Thun und Hohenstein in her full grace", Czarnecki wrote. He further asserted that "a Gräfin with a German-sounding name might do harm to the Civic Platform".

On 20 May 2009, it was revealed that Czarnecki himself would appear on the ballot sheets not under his assumed Polish name of Ryszard Henryk, but as Richard Henry, since he was born in the United Kingdom. Czarnecki stated that his situation is different, as he didn't choose his names, while Thun chose her surname by marrying her husband. Countess Thun retorted her name came out of love, adding "I pity Richard Henry Czarnecki".

Comparing Róża Thun to Nazi collaborators and dismissal as vice-president of the European Parliament 
In an interview published on January 3, 2018 in a Polish right-wing portal, Ryszard Czarnecki compared Róża Thun to Nazi collaborators, specifically people called szmalcownik. Consequently, at the request of the leaders of four European Parliament factions, on 7 February 2018 by secret ballot he was dismissed from the post of vice-president of the European Parliament for “serious breaches” of the Parliament's Rules (447 MEPs voted for his dismissal, 196 against, and 30 abstained). This was the first time in the history a vice-president of the European Parliament has been dismissed.

The case was reported in international media. Before the vote, Czarnecki urged MEPs to vote against his dismissal, arguing that such a vote would “support freedom of speech”, and in a letter to the president of the European Parliament Antonio Tajani, he lied that he had not compare Róża Thun to Nazi collaborators. In June 2019, the Court of Justice of the European Union dismissed Ryszard Czarnecki's complaint about the dismissal.

Róża Thun considered Ryszard Czarnecki's statement humiliating. She demanded an apology in the media and a payment of 50,000 zloty for the organization Forum for Dialogue (Forum dla Dialogu) and the “Children of the Holocaust” Association (Stowarzyszenie „Dzieci Holocaustu”). In August 2019, the District Court in Warsaw ruled that Ryszard Czarnecki, by comparing Róża Thun to Nazi collaborators, violated her good name, and therefore ordered him to publish an apology to the MEP on the portal that published the original interview, as well as on his own blog, within 14 days from the judgment validation. The court also ordered Czarnecki a payment for the benefit of the two organizations mentioned, of 15 thousand zlotys each. Ryszard Czarnecki announced an appeal against the sentence. In September 2020, the Court of Appeal in Warsaw upheld the judgment of the first instance court, ordering Ryszard Czarnecki to apologize for an “inappropriate and deeply hurtful” comparison, which was unlawful, and to pay the sum ordered in the first instance for the benefit of the two organizations. The court indicated that the defendant exceeded the limits of acceptable criticism and abused the freedom of speech.

See also 

 MEPs for Poland 2004–2009
 2004 European Parliament election in Poland

References

External links 

 
 
 

1963 births
Living people
Journalists from London
British people of Polish descent
Polish bloggers
Male bloggers
Members of the Polish Sejm 1991–1993
Members of the Polish Sejm 1997–2001
Self-Defence of the Republic of Poland MEPs
Law and Justice MEPs
MEPs for Poland 2004–2009
MEPs for Poland 2009–2014
Christian National Union politicians
MEPs for Poland 2014–2019
Recipients of the Order of Merit (Ukraine), 3rd class
MEPs for Poland 2019–2024
Polish Esperantists